Polyscias gracilis is a species of plant in the family Araliaceae. It is endemic to Mauritius.

References

gracilis
Endemic flora of Mauritius
Critically endangered plants
Taxonomy articles created by Polbot